Suzanne Preis Brøgger Zeruneith (born 18 November 1944 in open) is a Danish writer, a novelist, poet and journalist. Her first book Fri os fra kærligheden has been translated into c. 20 languages. Since 1997 she has been a member of the Danish Academy.

Early life 
Brøgger grew up in Denmark until she was fourteen, after that she moved abroad with her mother and her stepfather Svend Brøgger, who worked for UNICEF and was stationed in Colombo, Sri Lanka and later in Bangkok, Thailand. Suzanne Brøgger returned to Denmark to attend high school a couple of years later. She finished the Silkeborg Gymnasium (a secondary school) in 1964, and she then studied Russian and French at the University of Copenhagen. She did not graduate, but has later said that her university days inspired her to constantly extend her horizons in life-long study.

After secondary school
While studying she also worked as a model and with films and theatre. Through articles in Danish newspapers in the form of interviews, travel descriptions and war articles, she got in touch with a publishing house, which offered her to publish her first book. Her first book was the essay collection Fri os fra kærligheden (Deliver Us from Love), which was published in 1973, it is critical against the western way of life. Her break through in Danish literature was Creme Fraiche, which was published in 1978. This book is the first of a trilogy of autobiographical books and describes her childhood and youth years in Denmark and in the South Asia/Southeast Asia (Sri Lanka and Thailand). In 1997 she published one of her main works the family saga Jadekatten (The Jade Cat: A Family Saga, 1997) where she writes about the same autobiographical themes as in the trilogy, which started with Creme Fraiche in 1973, but here she also writes about her Jewish family who immigrated from Poland to Denmark. Besides from being a portrayal of the loss of a family, it is  also a showdown with her mother.

Family
She is the daughter of Ove Preis (1920–69) and Lilian Henius (1921–93), stepdaughter of Svend Brøgger. 
She is married to Keld Zeruneith, they have one child together.

Bibliography 
 1973 – Fri os fra kærligheden
 1975 – Kærlighedens veje & vildveje
 1978 – Creme fraiche
 1979 – En gris som har været oppe at slås kan man ikke stege
 1980 – Brøg, essays og journalistik fra 1960'erne
 1981 – Tone
 1984 – JA
 1986 – Den pebrede susen
 1988 – Livsformer – essay "Om at kysse hesten"
 1988 – Edvard og Elvira
 1990 – Min verden i en nøddeskal
 1991 – Efter Orgiet
 1993 – Paradisets Mave
 1993 – Transparence
 1994 – Vølvens spådom (poems, retelling of the Old Norse Völuspá)
 1995 – Løvespor
 1997 – Jadekatten (novel)
 1998 – Et frit og muntert lig
 1999 – Lotusøje (poems)
 2000 – Sejd
 2001 – Linda Evangelista Olsen
 2006 – Sølve
 2008 – Sløret (poems)
 2010 – Jeg har set den gamle verden forsvinde – hvor er mine ørenringe?
 2016 – En sommer med Emmanuelle Arsan (Un été avec Emmanuelle Arsan) bilingual postface (french/dansk) of La Philosophie Nue by Emmanuelle Arsan.

Awards and prizes 
Some of the many awards and prizes which Suzanne Brøgger has received:
 1975: PH-prisen
 1980: Weekendavisens Litteraturpris
 1982: De Gyldne Laurbær
 1985: Tagea Brandts Rejselegat
 1985: Lifelong grant from Statens Kunstfond
 1996: Dansk Kvindesamfunds Mathildepris
 1999: Søren Gyldendal Prize
 2001: Jeanne og Henri Nathansens Mindelegat
 2002: Adam Oehlenschläger Legatet
 2005: Rungstedlund Award

References

Literature
Louise Zeuthen. Krukke. En biografi om Suzanne Brøgger

External links 

 Suzanne Brøgger's official website and calendar
 Suzanne Brøgger on Litteratursiden.dk
 Suzanne Brøgger på Kvinfo.dk (Danish Women's Encyclopedia)
 Suzanne Brøgger on Bibliografi.dk
 One Long Letter to the World. A video interview with Suzanne Brøgger Video by Louisiana Channel
 Interview with Suzanne Brøgger about her university years in the 1960's Interview (in Danish) on Uniavisen.dk

1944 births
Living people
People from Copenhagen
Danish women novelists
Danish essayists
Danish Jews
Danish women essayists
20th-century Danish poets
21st-century Danish poets
Danish women poets
20th-century essayists
21st-century essayists
20th-century Danish women writers
21st-century Danish women writers